Anwara Syed Haq (born 1940) is a writer of Bangla literature. She has written a number of novels, short stories, children's books and also written a number of essays. She has been praised for using her knowledge of human psychology beautifully in her writings. She is a psychiatrist by profession. In 2019 her achievements for language and literature were rewarded with the Ekushey Padak.

Early life
Anwara Syed Haq was born into a  conservative Muslim family in the town of Jessore. She passed her childhood and teenage years in Jessore. Her father was a very pious man and insisted that she observe religious customs. She rarely had the opportunity to read novels, magazines or literary material in her school and college days. Her father's wish was that she would study medicine whereas her wish was that she would study English literature. To fulfill her father's wish she moved to Dhaka in 1959 and enrolled in a medical college.

Academic career
After completing her SSC and HSC in Jessore, Haq moved to Dhaka in 1959 and enrolled in Dhaka Medical College. She obtained her MBBS degree in 1965. In 1973 went to the United Kingdom for higher education. After having completed her post graduate degree in medical psychiatry in 1982 she returned home from the UK. She has since then worked at a number of institutions, among which are Pakistan Airforce, Dhaka Medical College and BIRDEM. Now she works professionally as a psychiatrist.

Personal life
Anwara Syed Haq married writer and poet Syed Shamsul Haq on November 19, 1965. They have one daughter and one son. Her daughter Bidita teaches English literature at higher school level. Her son Ditio is an IT specialist, writes stories, lyrics and music.

Awards
 Bangla Academy Literary Award in 2010
 Annanya Shahitya Puroshkar
 Agrani Bank Puroshkar
 Michael Madhushudhon Puroshkar
 Shishu Academy Puroshkar
 Ekushey Padak in 2019

Literary works
Haq's first short story "Paribartan" was published in Sangbad in 1954. From 1955 to 1957, she regularly wrote for Ittefaque's "Kachi Kanchar Ashor". Her first novel was published in Sachitra Shandhani in 1968. After her first novel, she has written a number of novels and short stories. Many of her novels are set in Dhaka and London where she spent much of her time. Her publications consist of twenty-five novels, three volumes of poems, eight collections of short stories, eight collections of essays, three autobiography volumes, two collections of travel writing, forty fictional stories for young readers.
 Bari O Banita
 Shei Prem Shei Shomoy
 Udoy Mina-ke Chay
 Bhalo-bashar Laal Pipre
 Osthirotar Kaal Bhalo-bashar Shomoy

Children's stories
 Ekjon Muktijoddhar chele  (]
 Montir Baba  (]
 Tomader Janno Egaroti  (]
 Ulto Payer Bhoot  (]
 Ami Babake Bhalobasi  (]
 Hanadar Bahini Jobdo  (]
° Amar Ma Shobcheye Bhalo

References

1949 births
Bangladeshi women writers
Living people
Bangladeshi psychiatrists
Recipients of Bangla Academy Award
Dhaka Medical College alumni
Women psychiatrists
Recipients of the Ekushey Padak